Ichthyocampus carce, also known as the freshwater pipefish or Indian freshwater pipefish is a species of marine fish belonging to the family Syngnathidae. It can be found mainly in freshwater streams, rivers, and estuaries located in the Indian Ocean and West Pacific, from Indonesia to the western coast of India. It can live in both inland and coastal waters. This species can grow to a length of 15cm and feeds primarily on small invertebrates and zooplankton. Reproduction occurs through ovoviviparity, in which the males carry eggs in a brood pouch before giving live birth. Males of this species can brood roughly 280 offspring at a time.

References

External links
Ichthyocampus carce at Fishbase

Syngnathidae
Fish described in 1822